The 1978 Benson & Hedges Cup was the seventh edition of cricket's Benson & Hedges Cup. The competition was won by Kent County Cricket Club.

Fixtures and results

Group stage

Group A

Group B

Group C

Group D

Quarter-finals

Semi-finals

Final

See also
Benson & Hedges Cup										

		

Benson & Hedges Cup seasons
1978 in English cricket